Independent Network News may refer to:

 Independent Network News (news agency), a nationwide news service for independent radio stations in the Republic of Ireland
 Independent Network News (TV program), a 1980–1990 American syndicated television news program

See also
Independent News Network, an American television news service based in Davenport, Iowa since 1999
American Independent News Network, an American network of Internet-published independent news organizations, since 2006